Dorothea Anne Franchi (17 February 1920 – 22 August 2003) was a New Zealand pianist, harpist, music educator and composer.

Early life and education 
Franchi was born in Auckland, New Zealand, in 1920, the daughter of Peter Rudolph and Gertrude Franchi. She studied at the Auckland Teachers College and the University of Auckland, where she graduated BMus in 1939. She then went to the Royal College of Music in London in 1948. She studied harp, composition and piano accompaniment.

Career 
Franchi taught music at Epsom Girls' Grammar School in Auckland before going to study in London. From 1953 to 1958 she took the position of musical director and pianist for the newly formed New Zealand Ballet Company, working with Poul Gnatt. She had a successful career as a pianist and harpist, and her works are performed internationally.

Honours and awards
Lionel Tertis Prize for Viola Rhapsody, 1950
Philip Neill Memorial Prize, 1947	
The Composers Association of New Zealand KBB Citation for Services to New Zealand Music, 2000

Works
Franchi composed for orchestra, chamber ensemble, voice and instrumental performance. Selected works include:
A Man of Life Upright for bass and piano	
A Wet Night in Greymouth for voice and piano	 	
Abel Tasman for voice, piccolo, piano and drum	
Apple-Picking Time for voice and piano	
Concertino for harmonica, harp and strings	
Do-Wack-A-Do (1956) – orchestral suite from the ballet of the same name
El Bailador Inamorado song cycle for tenor and piano	
Eventide for tenor, string quartet and piano	
Four Pioneer Portraits (1949) – cycle of four songs for mezzo-soprano and piano based on poems by Robin Hyde, Eileen Duggan and Louis Esson
God Bless You Boy for voice and piano

References

1920 births
2003 deaths
20th-century classical composers
New Zealand classical composers
New Zealand music teachers
Women classical composers
Women music educators
20th-century women composers
New Zealand expatriates in the United Kingdom